Zavidovka is a rural locality (a selo) and the administrative center of Zavidovskoye Rural Settlement, Yakovlevsky District, Belgorod Oblast, Russia. The population was 571 as of 2010. There are 5 streets.

Geography 
Zavidovka is located 38 km northwest of Stroitel (the district's administrative centre) by road. Rakovo is the nearest rural locality.

References 

Rural localities in Yakovlevsky District, Belgorod Oblast